Rachel Wilson is a professor of neurobiology at Harvard Medical School and is a Howard Hughes Medical Institute Investigator. Wilson's work integrates electrophysiology, neuropharmacology, molecular genetics, functional anatomy, and behavior to explore how neural circuits are organized to react and sense a complex environment.

Education and early career
Wilson was born in Kansas City, Missouri. She received a B.A. in chemistry from Harvard University in 1996 and a Ph.D. in neuroscience from the University of California, San Francisco in 2001, where she worked in the laboratory of Roger Nicoll. There, she worked on what her peers called "the project of death," searching for the molecule in the brain that enabled neurons to communicate in reverse—known as retrograde signaling—across synapses. She discovered that a molecule known as endocannabinoids—which mimic the active ingredient in marijuana and naturally exist in the brain—were responsible for allowing post-synaptic neurons to communicate to their pre-synaptic counterparts. Using rats as a model organism, she found that these molecules support cognitive function in the hippocampus, the center of the brain that is involved in learning and memory formation. Wilson's hypothesis, based on the number of cannabinoid receptors in the hippocampus, is that these endocannabinoids help the brain create new memories and strengthen connections between neurons.

Following her Ph.D., Wilson became a postdoctoral researcher at California Institute of Technology, working in the laboratory of Gilles Laurent. There, she began working on Drosophila (fruit flies) as a model organism, seeking to understand how neurons integrate information from their surroundings. She recorded electrical signals in the brain of these flies to understand how those signals corresponded to specific odors as stimuli.

Research
In 2004, Wilson started her own laboratory and research program at Harvard University.

Awards
In 2007 Wilson won Science and Eppendorf AG's Grand Prize in Neurobiology for her work on the olfactory function of fruit flies Drosophila melanogaster, to understand how the brain recognizes odors from patterns of impulses from olfactory receptor neurons.

In 2008 she won a MacArthur Fellowship.

In 2014, she won the inaugural national Blavatnik National Award for Young Scientists, awarded by the Blavatnik Family Foundation and the New York Academy of Sciences to "celebrate America’s most innovative and promising faculty-rank scientists and engineers."

In 2012 she was made a full professor at Harvard Medical School in the Department of Neurobiology; she currently holds the Joseph B. Martin Professorship in Basic Research.

In 2017, Wilson was appointed to the National Academy of Sciences for her contributions to neurophysiology.

References

External links
Wilson Lab at Harvard University

MacArthur Fellows
American women neuroscientists
Harvard College alumni
University of California, San Francisco alumni
Harvard Medical School faculty
Living people
Year of birth missing (living people)
Scientists from Kansas City, Missouri
Scientists from Missouri
Members of the United States National Academy of Sciences
American women academics
21st-century American women scientists